The KAB-500S-E is a guided bomb designed for the Russian Air Force and is also the first guided bomb of the Russian Federation. It uses the GLONASS satellite navigation system and is the Russian equivalent of the Joint Direct Attack Munition (JDAM) weapons family. It was first used during the Russian military intervention in the Syrian Civil War. The bomb's first trials were in 2000 and it was displayed at airshows in 2003.

It is designed to destroy targets in harbors, industrial facilities and depots and uses an impact fuse with three programmable modes. KTRV has fully completed testing of products of the K08B and K029B (UPAB-1500) types, both products are in serial production and are delivered to combat units.

See also
KAB-500KR
KAB-1500S-E

References

External list

Aerial bombs of Russia
Guided bombs